Abbas Shiblak (born 6 January 1944) is a Palestinian academic, historian, Research Associate at the Refugee Studies Centre (RSC), University of Oxford (a post he has held since 1992), free-lance writer, former diplomat and an advocate of human rights.

Shiblak specializes in refugee-host country relationships and international humanitarian law. For the last few years, he has been working on a paper on the topic of statelessness in the Arab region.

Shiblak founded Shaml, the Palestinian Refugee and Diaspora Centre in Ramallah, and also served as its first director. Shiblak was also a member of the Palestinian delegation to the peace talks on the "Working Group on Refugees".

Personal life 

Shiblak was born in Palestine on 6 January 1944 and, after completing his schooling in Jordan, his university education in Egypt and working in Lebanon, he moved to Britain in 1975, where he completed his postgraduate education in international relations. Shiblak then pursued a career in free-lance journalism, diplomacy, and developed an interest in refugee affairs and stateless communities, with particular reference to the Middle East. He is regularly consulted by inter-governmental organisations, non-governmental organisations, immigration agencies, law firms, academic institutions and the mass media to advise and comment on refugee affairs and statelessness.  Shiblak resides in the United Kingdom.

Publications 
Among his most recent publications: 
 The Palestinian diaspora in Europe; Challenge of Adaptation and Identity (ed), Shaml & IJS, Jerusalem, 2005.
 A new edition of his book on the Exodus of the Iraqi Jewish community 1949-1951, Saqi Books, London 2005.
 Iraqi Jews: A History 
 The Lure of Zion: The Case of the Iraqi Jews 
 Residency status and civil rights of Palestinian refugees in Arab countries 
 Palestinians in Lebanon and the PLO 
 Statelessness among Palestinian Refugees 

Forthcoming work:
‘Citizens, Sub-Citizens and non Citizens: the Issue of Citizenship and Statelessness in the Arab Region’ .

References 

1944 births
Living people
21st-century Palestinian historians
Palestinian diplomats
20th-century Palestinian historians
Palestinian journalists
Palestinian emigrants to the United Kingdom
Academics of the University of Oxford